The 2010 Formula Nippon Championship was the thirty-eighth season of the premier Japanese open-wheel motor racing series. The series for Formula Nippon racing cars was contested over eight races at seven rounds, beginning on 18 April at Suzuka and ending at the same venue on 7 November. A non-championship meeting at Fuji Speedway completed the season's racing a week later.

Having missed the 2009 season to focus on his Super GT commitments, João Paulo de Oliveira returned to the series and claimed his first championship title since winning the 2005 All-Japan Formula Three Championship. Team Impul's de Oliveira had held the championship lead by a point over TOM'S driver André Lotterer before the final double-header round at Suzuka, but de Oliveira's victory – his second victory after a win at Twin Ring Motegi – and fourth against Lotterer's second and a third, de Oliveira won the championship by 4.5 points. As well as his win at Autopolis, Lotterer won both non-championship races at Fuji.

Third place was disputed by reigning champion Loïc Duval, who had moved from Nakajima Racing to Docomo Team Dandelion Racing over the off-season, and his former Nakajima team-mate Takashi Kogure, which was resolved in favour of Duval by 1.5 points; both drivers' championship chances had been stunted by no points at Autopolis, as Duval failed to start and Kogure retired from the race. Duval did tie with de Oliveira for most victories during the season with two – Motegi and Suzuka – while Kogure won the season-opening race at Suzuka. De Oliveira's team-mate Kohei Hirate finished the season fifth with a victory at Fuji, ahead of the season's other race-winner Kazuya Oshima of the TOM's team.

Teams and drivers

* Drivers who participated in the non-championship round at Fuji Speedway.

Race calendar and results

 All races were held in Japan. A non-championship round, entitled Super GT and Formula Nippon Sprint Cup 2010, was held at the conclusion of the season.

Championship standings

Drivers' Championship

Scoring system

† Round with two races and points scoring system for each race.
‡ Non-championship round, with no points awarded.

Teams' Championship

Scoring system

References

External links
2010 Japanese Championship Formula Nippon

Formula Nippon
Super Formula
Nippon